Sciodaphyllum is a genus of flowering plants in the family Araliaceae, native to Central America, the Caribbean, and northern South America. It was resurrected from Schefflera in 2020.

Species
The following species are accepted:

Sciodaphyllum acuminatum 
Sciodaphyllum albocapitatum 
Sciodaphyllum allocotanthum 
Sciodaphyllum angulatum 
Sciodaphyllum aquaverense 
Sciodaphyllum archeri 
Sciodaphyllum argophyllum 
Sciodaphyllum asymmetricum 
Sciodaphyllum attenuatum 
Sciodaphyllum awa 
Sciodaphyllum ayangannense 
Sciodaphyllum bangii 
Sciodaphyllum basiorevolutum 
Sciodaphyllum bejucosum 
Sciodaphyllum bifidum 
Sciodaphyllum bifurcatum 
Sciodaphyllum blepharidophyllum 
Sciodaphyllum bogotense 
Sciodaphyllum bonitum 
Sciodaphyllum breviramum 
Sciodaphyllum brownei 
Sciodaphyllum buchtienii 
Sciodaphyllum caducum 
Sciodaphyllum cajambrense 
Sciodaphyllum calycinum 
Sciodaphyllum calyptricuspidatum 
Sciodaphyllum capitulispicatum 
Sciodaphyllum cartagoense 
Sciodaphyllum chachapoyense 
Sciodaphyllum chartaceum 
Sciodaphyllum chococolum 
Sciodaphyllum cicatricatum 
Sciodaphyllum ciliatum 
Sciodaphyllum clausum 
Sciodaphyllum coclense 
Sciodaphyllum concolor 
Sciodaphyllum connatum 
Sciodaphyllum contractum 
Sciodaphyllum cracens 
Sciodaphyllum crassilimbum 
Sciodaphyllum decagynum 
Sciodaphyllum dielsii 
Sciodaphyllum diguanum 
Sciodaphyllum digynum 
Sciodaphyllum diplodactylum 
Sciodaphyllum dolichostylum 
Sciodaphyllum duidae 
Sciodaphyllum elachistocephalum 
Sciodaphyllum epiphyticum 
Sciodaphyllum euryphyllum 
Sciodaphyllum ferrugineum 
Sciodaphyllum fragrans 
Sciodaphyllum geniculatum 
Sciodaphyllum glabratum 
Sciodaphyllum guanayense 
Sciodaphyllum herthae 
Sciodaphyllum herzogii 
Sciodaphyllum heterotrichum 
Sciodaphyllum huilense 
Sciodaphyllum humboldtianum 
Sciodaphyllum inambaricum 
Sciodaphyllum institum 
Sciodaphyllum jauaense 
Sciodaphyllum jefense 
Sciodaphyllum karstenianum 
Sciodaphyllum kuntzei 
Sciodaphyllum lancifoliolatum 
Sciodaphyllum lasiogyne 
Sciodaphyllum latiligulatum 
Sciodaphyllum lilacinum 
Sciodaphyllum macphersonii 
Sciodaphyllum magnifolium 
Sciodaphyllum maguireorum 
Sciodaphyllum manus-dei 
Sciodaphyllum marahuacense 
Sciodaphyllum marginatum 
Sciodaphyllum mathewsii 
Sciodaphyllum meiurophyllum 
Sciodaphyllum minutiflorum 
Sciodaphyllum monzonense 
Sciodaphyllum munchiquense 
Sciodaphyllum nebularum 
Sciodaphyllum nephelophilum 
Sciodaphyllum nicaraguense 
Sciodaphyllum octostylum 
Sciodaphyllum oxapampense 
Sciodaphyllum panamense 
Sciodaphyllum paniculitomentosum 
Sciodaphyllum pardoanum 
Sciodaphyllum paruanum 
Sciodaphyllum patulum 
Sciodaphyllum pedicellatum 
Sciodaphyllum pedicelligerum 
Sciodaphyllum pentadactylum 
Sciodaphyllum pentandrum 
Sciodaphyllum peruvianum 
Sciodaphyllum pittieri  – Costa Rica and Panama
Sciodaphyllum planchonianum 
Sciodaphyllum pygmaeum 
Sciodaphyllum quinduense 
Sciodaphyllum quinquestylorum 
Sciodaphyllum ramosissimum 
Sciodaphyllum reticulatum 
Sciodaphyllum robustum 
Sciodaphyllum rodolfoi 
Sciodaphyllum rubiginosum 
Sciodaphyllum rufilanceolatum 
Sciodaphyllum sachamatense 
Sciodaphyllum samarianum 
Sciodaphyllum sandianum 
Sciodaphyllum sapoense 
Sciodaphyllum sararense 
Sciodaphyllum seibertii 
Sciodaphyllum silvaticum 
Sciodaphyllum sipapoense 
Sciodaphyllum sodiroi 
Sciodaphyllum sonsonense 
Sciodaphyllum sphaerocoma 
Sciodaphyllum sprucei 
Sciodaphyllum steyermarkii 
Sciodaphyllum systylum 
Sciodaphyllum tamanum 
Sciodaphyllum ternatum 
Sciodaphyllum tipuanicum 
Sciodaphyllum tremuloideum 
Sciodaphyllum trianae 
Sciodaphyllum trollii 
Sciodaphyllum troyanum 
Sciodaphyllum urbanianum 
Sciodaphyllum vanderwerffii 
Sciodaphyllum vasquezianum 
Sciodaphyllum velutinum 
Sciodaphyllum venezuelense 
Sciodaphyllum viguierianum 
Sciodaphyllum violaceum 
Sciodaphyllum weberbaueri 
Sciodaphyllum whitefoordiae 
Sciodaphyllum yurumanguine 
Sciodaphyllum zarucchii

References

Araliaceae
Apiales genera